The following is a list of stations found within Chongqing Rail Transit.

Loop line

Line 1

Line 2

Line 3

Line 4

Line 5

Line 6

Line 9

Line 10

Notes

References

Metro
Chongqing Rail Transit stations
Chongqing